Wadebridge and Padstow Rural District was a local government division of Cornwall in England, UK, between 1968 and 1974. The rural district was created in 1968 through the abolition of Padstow Urban District and Wadebridge Rural District.

In 1974 the district was abolished under the Local Government Act 1972, forming part of the new North Cornwall district.

Civil parishes
The civil parishes within the district were:

 Blisland
 Cardinham
 Egloshayle
 Helland
 Lanhydrock
 Lanivet
 Padstow
 St Breock
 St Endellion
 St Ervan
 St Eval
 St Issey
 St Kew
 St Mabyn
 St Merryn
 St Minver Highlands
 St Minver Lowlands
 St Tudy
 Wadebridge
 Withiel

References

1968 establishments in England
Districts of England abolished by the Local Government Act 1972
Rural districts of England
Local government in Cornwall
History of Cornwall